Deirdre McNamer is an American novelist. McNamer is on the fiction faculty of the Bennington Writing Seminars' MFA program, and previously taught in the Masters of Fine Arts (MFA) program at the University of Montana, Missoula,. She chaired the fiction panel that judged the 2011 National Book Awards, and in 2015 received an Artists Innovation Award from the Montana Arts Council.

Published works
McNamer has written several novels, including
 Rima in the Weeds (1991)
 One Sweet Quarrel (1994)
 My Russian (1999)
 Red Rover (2007)
 Aviary (2021)

Critic Sven Birkerts: "Red Rover" is suggestively compressed in its way of paying out revelations, which steadily gather mass and shadows. Indeed, the means of presentation, the structural logic of the novel, are as much a part of its meaning as its thematic suggestions. McNamer's way of combining her far-flung episodes effectively triangulates the unknowable event at the heart of the novel; we work out much of the drama through a kind of echolocation."  The Washington Post, Los Angeles Times and Artforum all named Red Rover to their "Best Book" of 2007 lists.  McNamer's stories and essays have  appeared in The New Yorker, Ploughshares, Doubletake, and The New York Times Book Review.

References

External links
 

20th-century American novelists
21st-century American novelists
American women novelists
20th-century American women writers
21st-century American women writers
Living people
Year of birth missing (living people)